Fxguide, trademarked as fxguide, is a visual effects and post-production community website founded by three visual effects artists, Jeff Heusser, John Montgomery, and Mike Seymour.

History
Fxguide began in 1999 as a website to expand on tips, tricks and frequently asked questions arising on the email newsgroup "flame-news," which related to the [compositing] application Discreet Flame. Fxguide was founded by Mike Seymour, John Montgomery and Jeff Heusser.  Initially the focus was on high-end compositing, but the site evolved over the years to encompass visual effects news and training on the web. It has since been split into the free fxguide website for news and interviews and the membership-based fxphd visual effects training site.

On June 27, 2005, fxguide launched a podcast, featuring interviews with artists as well as manufacturers. On July 18, 2007 fxguidetv launched as an HD video podcast featuring film-scene reviews and industry coverage as well as interviews. The show is hosted by Angie Dale (née Richards). On April 2, 2008, fxguide added another regular podcast, "red centre", which started focused on the RED camera and has grown to cover all aspects of digital cinematography. Hosted by Mike Seymour and Jason Wingrove. In 2010, show's title was changed to "the rc". While The RC has now stopped, but the VFXshow podcast continues with regular hosts Mike Seymour, Matt Wallin and Jason Diamond, with a range of other guest hosts.

Jeff Heusser died in 2018; Fxguide continues with John Montgomery and Mike Seymour.  

From 2011 to 2012, fxguide did special video segments for The Daily titled "Behind the Scenes". The team has since done another webseries for Wired, "Design-fx".

Mike Seymour also founded the Motus Lab at the University of Sydney, having got a Ph.D in Digital Humans, and having been involved in the Epic Games MEETMIKE Siggraph project.

References

External links

Visual effects companies
Cinematic techniques
Film and video technology
Special effects
Computer graphic techniques